Brown–Stroud Field is a baseball venue in Natchitoches, Louisiana, United States.  It is home to the Northwestern State Demons baseball team of the NCAA Division I Southland Conference.  Opened on April 1, 1939, the venue has a capacity of 1,200 spectators.  It is named after the first two coaches of the Northwestern State baseball program: C. C. Stroud, who coached from 1912 to 1930, and H. Alvin Brown, who coached from 1949 to 1966.  Recently added features include chairback seating, an awning that partially covers seating areas, a turf infield, landscaping, and a sound system.  The venue's bleacher seating and dugouts have recently been renovated.

Attendance 
The following is a list of the top 10 single-game attendance figures, as of the end of the 2014 season.

See also 
 List of NCAA Division I baseball venues

References

External links
"Sign of Progress at Brown–Stroud Field" by Doug Ireland, August 19, 2007

Baseball venues in Louisiana
College baseball venues in the United States
Northwestern State Demons baseball
Sports venues in Natchitoches, Louisiana
Buildings and structures in Natchitoches, Louisiana
1939 establishments in Louisiana
Sports venues completed in 1939
Southland Conference Baseball Tournament venues